Vespina slovaciella is a moth of the family Incurvariidae. It is found in Slovakia and Hungary.

The larva feeds on Acer species. Young larva make a circular blotch. It cuts out an excision and drops to the ground, where it continues living in the litter.

References

Moths described in 1990
Incurvariidae
Moths of Europe